The 1994–95 Azadegan League was the fourth season of the Azadegan League that was won by Saipa.

Group stage

Knockout stage

Semi-final 

|}

First Leg

Second Leg

First Leg

Second Leg

Notes

Third-place match

not held because Persepolis refused to participate.

Final

Final standings

Notes
 Azadegan League champions   : Saipa F.C.
 Relegated teams             : Shahin Bushehr, Qods Sari, Nassaji Mazandaran, Teraktor Sazi, Zob Ahan, Sanat Naft, Pars Khodro, Payam Gach Khorasan, Bank Tejarat, Chooka Talesh, Naft Ghaemshahr, Shahdari Sari
 Promoted teams              : Bahman, Polyacryl Esfahan, Shemushack Noshahr
 Malavan was initially supposed to be relegated to the 2nd Division, but since Bank Melli- which was to be promoted to the 1st Division - withdrew, the Federation offered their spot to Malavan.

Top goal scorers

20
  Farshad Pious (Persepolis)
15
  Ali Daei (Persepolis)
14
  Seyed Kamal Hosseini (Zob Ahan)
12
  Ahmad Reza Sohrabi (Pas)
11
  Edmond Akhtar (docharhkeh savaran)
  Edmond Bezik (Ararat)

References

Pars Sport

Azadegan League seasons
Iran
1994–95 in Iranian football